Presidential elections were held in Brazil on 1 March 1926. The result was a victory for Washington Luís of the Republican Party of São Paulo, who received 98.0% of the vote.

Results

References

Presidential elections in Brazil
Brazil
President
Brazil
Election and referendum articles with incomplete results
Elections of the First Brazilian Republic